Africa Beza College is a private university college in Ethiopia, founded on November 20, 2005, in Awassa, the Southern Nations, Nationalities, and Peoples Region state capital. It initially had an enrollment of 450 students. Shortly thereafter, ABUC expanded to Shashemene and also opened Addis Ababa and Nekemte branches in October 1999 and January 2000, respectively.

Universities and colleges in Ethiopia
Educational institutions established in 1999
1999 establishments in Ethiopia
Education in Addis Ababa
Educational institutions established in 2005
2005 establishments in Ethiopia